Idol 2020 was the sixteenth season of the Swedish Idol series. Like earlier seasons, the season was broadcast on TV4. New for this year is that one person got to audition for this season already during the final of Idol 2019 in Globen, Rebecka Assio made it through to the final audition in Stockholm.

On 22 September, contestant Caspar Camitz tested positive for COVID-19 and would miss the first Top 13 performance. On 25 September, just a few hours away from the airing of the first Friday show, Affe Hagström, Nadja Holm and Herman Silow also tested positive for the virus, which led to changes to the week's show. The contestants therefore performed their songs from their suites at their hotel. Affe Hagström, who was going to sing the song "Sun Is Shining (Band of Gold)" by Vargas & Lagola, made the decision to not perform that week.

On 26 September, it was announced that contestant Indra Elg, who just had left the competition one day earlier, also tested positive for COVID-19, just like Caspar Camitz, Affe Hagström, Nadja Holm and Herman Silow.

On 16 October, just a few hours away from airing the fourth Friday show, contestant Affe Hagström made the decision to leave the competition.

On 12 November, it was announced that, just because of COVID-19, the final would not be held in the Globen Arena on 4 December, like it has been since 2007, and would instead be held in the Idol Studio in Spånga. It is the first time since 2006 that the final has been held in the Idol Studio.

Nadja Holm and Paulina Pancenkov made it to the final on 4 December. Nadja Holm was the winner. It was also Nikki Amini's last season as a judge member of the show, which means that she would no longer be a part of the show. She was later replaced by Katia Mosally, who has been a judge member since the season of 2021 and onwards.

Top 22

From Stockholm auditions
Affe Hagström,  Värmdö
Caspar Camitz, Norrtälje
Ella Hedström, Täby
Gabriel Abdulahad,  Norrköping
Herman Silow, Stockholm
Isabella Ohlsson,  Stockholm
Kong Phan, Stockholm
Linnéa Samuelsson, Tyresö
Nova Luther, Stockholm
Simon Karlsson, Stockholm
Tara Naderpour, Upplands Väsby

From Gothenburg auditions
Edvin Hakimzadeh,  Borås
Felix Enghult,  Göteborg
Indra Elg, Växjö
Melissa Lund,  Äspered
Rebecka Assio, Falköping (did not audition in Gothenburg, but took part in the final part of the auditions in the city)
Tess Gustafsson, Landvetter

From Sundsvall auditions
Maya Arctaedius,  Umeå
Nadja Holm, Piteå

From Helsingborg auditions
Mattias Nederman, Skurup
Niklas Hultberg, Karlskrona
Paulina Pancenkov, Bjuv

Elimination chart

Top 12 (originally Top 13) - This is Me 

Affe Hagström did not perform that week.

Top 12 - On Swedish

Top 11 - My Idol

Top 9 - Winnersongs 

Affe Hagström withdrew from the competition that week.

Top 8 (First Week) - 80s & 90s

Top 8 (Second Week) - Viewers Choice

Top 7 - Back to Top

Top 6 - Powerwomans & Duets

Top 5 – Love

Top 4 – Semifinal: Jurys Choice & Free Choice 

in this semifinal will 2 acts leave the competition.

Top 2 – Final: Free Choice, Da Capo & Winner's Single

References

External links
Idol at TV4

2020
2020 in Swedish music
2020 Swedish television seasons
2020 in Swedish television